The FIBA Under-16 Americas Championship is the Americas basketball championship for players under 16 years that take place every two years among national teams of the FIBA Americas zone. The event started in 2009. The top four finishers qualify for the FIBA Under-17 Basketball World Cup.

Summary

Medal table

Participation details

MVP Awards

See also
 FIBA Under-18 Americas Championship
 FIBA Under-16 Women's Americas Championship

External links
2018 FIBA Centrobasket U15 Tournament
2018 FIBA South American U15 Tournament
fibaamericas.com
2019 Tournament
2017 Tournament
2015 Tournament
2013 Tournament
2011 Tournament
2009 Tournament

 
Basketball competitions in the Americas between national teams
2009 establishments in South America
2009 establishments in North America
Amersia